is a 1988 ice hockey video game published and developed by Nintendo, originally for the Famicom Disk System. It was later released in North America and in some PAL regions on the Nintendo Entertainment System. In 2006, it was re-released for the Wii's Virtual Console service in Japan, North America, and some PAL regions.

Ice Hockey is based on the sport of the same name, with the objective of the game being to get more points than the opposing player by hitting round, black pucks into the opposing goal with a hockey stick. It is well-regarded by critics, and has been often cited as one of the best games for the NES.

Gameplay
The play and mechanics of Ice Hockey are mostly similar to that of ice hockey in real life. The objective for both teams is to hit a black puck with a hockey stick into the opponent's goal. Teams are made up of five players including the goaltender, as opposed to six in real life. Players wear ice skates, which are used to skate across the icy rink. Each game is made up of three periods, with the victory going to the team who has the most points at the end of the game. At the beginning, two opposing players from each team face off in the middle of the rink. The player selects from three kinds of hockey player: the first is fast, weak, and feeble, but is good at the face-off; the second is average in all qualities, and the third is slow and poor at the face-off, but very powerful, both in body checking and shooting strength. The arena is similarly designed to a real-world ice hockey arena. The rink is coated in ice, with a goal on either side of the arena. There are a variety of marked areas, including the goal line that the puck must cross to score, the attacking/defending zone which is situated closely to each goal, the face-off spot, the neutral spot, and others. Each side of the rink has exactly the same design. If two opposing players fight for the puck for a certain amount of time, other players join the fight, resulting in the player from the losing team in the fight being put in the penalty box for a period of time.

Regional differences
There are some regional differences in the team roster line-ups. In Japan's Famicom Disk System version, the lineup is Japan (JPN), United States (USA), Czechoslovakia (TCH), Canada (CAN), Poland (POL), and the Soviet Union (URS).

For the PAL versions, Nintendo removed Japan from the team roster and included Sweden instead. For the North American and European version, Nintendo included these six teams: the United States (USA), Sweden (SWE), Czechoslovakia (TCH), Canada (CAN), Poland (POL), and the Soviet Union (URS).

There are also differences in the music. In the Japanese version, the music for the in-game play, and for scoring a goal, is completely different from the US version.

Reception and legacy
Ice Hockey was rated the 142nd best game made on a Nintendo System in Nintendo Power's Top 200 Games list. Electronic Gaming Monthly listed it as number 94 on their 100 best console video games of all time, remarking that it "has some of the most hilarious gameplay of any sports game ever, yet it still requires a lot of skill to play and accurately represents the excitement of real hockey. Fights turn into brawls, close games raise the crowd noise up when the game clock reaches two minutes, and the available team members vary in ability, making for (gasp!) strategic play." It was also included in IGN's top 100 NES games list, ranking at 100. Mark Bozon praised it for being the most addictive of Nintendo's early sports titles, commenting that it was in his NES as often as Super Mario Bros. 3 was. Aaron Thomas of GameSpot also commended the Virtual Console re-release for being "one of those rare NES sports games that's almost as much fun to play today as it was when it was released."

Hideki Konno, the designer of the game, later went on to direct and produce classic Nintendo titles such as Super Mario Kart, Super Mario World 2: Yoshi's Island, and Luigi's Mansion.

The Fat Hockey Player appears as a collectible sticker in Super Smash Bros. Brawl.

References

External links

 Ice Hockey 68k Port to TI-89/Titanium, TI-92/Plus, and Voyage 200 calculators located at ticalc.org
Ice Hockey at NinDB
Official entry into the Hockeywood Video Game Hall of Fame Official entry into the Hockeywood Video Game Hall of Fame

1988 video games
Famicom Disk System games
Ice hockey video games
Nintendo Entertainment System games
Nintendo games
Pax Softnica games
Video games developed in Japan
Video games scored by Soyo Oka
Virtual Console games
Virtual Console games for Wii U
Multiplayer and single-player video games
Nintendo Switch Online games